The Zambezi (sometimes spelled Zambesi) is the fourth largest river in Africa, and the largest to flow into the Indian Ocean.

Zambezi may also refer to:

Geography
Zambezi, Zambia, a town in the North-Western Province of Zambia
Zambezi Escarpment, escarpments forming both sides of the rift valley in which lie the middle Zambezi River and Lake Kariba
Zambezi District, a district of Zambia, located in North-Western Province
Zambezi Region, administrative region of Namibia, located at the end of the northeastern tip of the country

Transport
Air Zambezi, an airline in Zimbabwe
Zambezi Airlines, a privately owned airline based in Lusaka, Zambia
Zambezi Sawmills Railway or Mulobezi Railway, a railway in southern Zambia

Wildlife
Zambezi shark or Bull shark, a shark common to warm, shallow waters
Zambezi flapshell turtle, a species of softshell turtle in the family Trionychidae
Zambezi indigobird, also known as the twinspot indigobird or green indigobird, is a species of bird in the family Viduidae

Other uses
 Zambezi (beer), Zimbabwe's national beer
Zambezi Sun, a Thoroughbred racehorse who competes in France
 O Zambezi, the fifth album by New Zealand / Australian rock band Dragon
Zambezi FM Radio, a commercial radio station located in the tourist capital of Zambia Livingstone
"Zambezi", a song composed by Nico Carstens
 A fictional country in the 1991 comedy film King Ralph

See also
Lower Zambezi National Park, park on the north bank of the Zambezi River in south eastern Zambia
Upper Zambezi labeo, a fish of the genus Labeo
Upper Zambezi yellowfish, a fish found in the Zambezi River and common to southern Africa
Zambezi Zinger, a roller coaster at Worlds of Fun in Kansas City, Missouri, United States